Yunhuqiao Town is an urban town in Xiangtan County, Hunan Province, People's Republic of China.

Administrative division
The town is divided into 46 villages and two communities, the following areas: Yunhu Community, Qili Community, Qili Village, Shimazui Village, Chujia Village, Yunhu Village, Shijingpu Village, Yunfeng'an Village, Xinnan Village, Jizhong Village, Wangjiawan Village, Houjia Village, Shuihu Village, Malanqiao Village, Tielutang Village, Feilun Village, Hefu Village, Wangmei Village, Bei'an Village, Anren Village, Tian'e Village, Liema Village, Longshan Village, Xianjiang Village, Yanglin Village, Shiniu Village, Shijia Village, Hanposhan Village, Dongtang Village, Yanshan Village, Da'an Village, Tianxing Village, Xiongjia Village, Guhu Village, Huangjin Village, Shixiong Village, Tuoshan Village, Lianghu Village, Jianxin Village, Jiandong Village, Lishan Village, Tangwan Village, Qingfeng Village, Yishan Village, Gaohu Village, Shijia'ao Village, Lixin Village, and Nanzhu Village.

History
Yunhuqiao Township was built in 1985. In 1995, Yunhuqiao Town was built.

Economy
The region abounds with coal and limestone.

Rice, sweet potato and pig are important to the economy.

Attractions
Yunhu Bridge was built in 1472 and later destroyed and rebuilt several times.

Celebrity
Tang Hongbo, People's Liberation Army soldier and astronaut.

Culture
Huaguxi is the most influence local theater.

References

External links

Divisions of Xiangtan County